Brett Clark (born ) is an Australian former rugby league footballer who played in the 1980s.

Brett Clark was a halfback for Western Suburbs for four seasons between 1984-1987. He finished his career at the St. George Dragons, for two seasons between 1988-1989 and played halfback in the Dragons victorious team that won the 1988 Panasonic Cup. Clark also played for St. Helens (Heritage № 987), Oldham (Heritage № 953), Rochdale Hornets, Hunslet and Swinton in England between 1986-1995.

References

External links
Saints Heritage Society profile

1961 births
Living people
Australian rugby league players
Hunslet R.L.F.C. players
Oldham R.L.F.C. players
Place of birth missing (living people)
Rochdale Hornets players
Rugby league halfbacks
St Helens R.F.C. players
St. George Dragons players
Swinton Lions players
Western Suburbs Magpies players